Stenolemoides is a genus of thread-legged bugs in the family Reduviidae. There are at least three described species in Stenolemoides.

Species
These three species belong to the genus Stenolemoides:
 Stenolemoides arizonensis (Banks, 1909)
 Stenolemoides brasiliensis Wygodzinsky, 1947
 Stenolemoides oliveirai Wygodzinsky, 1966

References

Further reading

 
 

Reduviidae
Articles created by Qbugbot